Rinkaby is a locality situated in Kristianstad Municipality, Skåne County, Sweden with 745 inhabitants in 2010. It is close to Lake Hammarsjön and 12 kilometres from Kristianstad. The village has a pre-school and primary school which is housed in a building originating in the 19th century. There is a leisure centre, a football club and some shops.

The area has Stone Age remains; the name of the village is probably derived from the word rinkʀ (Old West Norse rekkr), meaning 'man' or 'warrior', and by denotes a settlement in Old Swedish. Rinkaby Church was built in the 13th century and contains medieval murals and an astronomical clock. It is an agricultural community; in the 19th century, the area was famous for growing tobacco, but now specialises in the rearing of Angus cattle.

Outside the village is a military training area called Rinkabyfältet which is often used for major Scouting events. A national jamboree called "Scout 2001" had 26,500 participants; the 22nd World Scout Jamboree in July–August 2011 was attended by more than 40,000 Scouts, Leaders and adult volunteers participating, from 143 different countries.

References 

Populated places in Kristianstad Municipality
Populated places in Skåne County